The Dawson County Courthouse, built in 1858, is a historic two-story redbrick courthouse building located on Courthouse Square in Dawsonville, Georgia. It was built as a simple  by  brick building in 1858. An addition was added in 1958.

It was listed on the National Register of Historic Places in 1980.

It was renovated in 1989/90.

The building is not the current courthouse, which is located several blocks north.

References

Courthouses on the National Register of Historic Places in Georgia (U.S. state)
Government buildings completed in 1858
Buildings and structures in Dawson County, Georgia
Former county courthouses in Georgia (U.S. state)
National Register of Historic Places in Dawson County, Georgia